Selmeston is a village and civil parish in the Wealden District of East Sussex, England. It is located eight miles (13 km) east of Lewes, to the north of the A27 road between there and Polegate.

The church existed at the time of its mention in the Domesday Book of 1086; it is dedicated to St Mary. The ecclesiastical parish is linked with the village of Alciston. The Domesday Book also has entries for the two large houses that lie in the Parish, Sherrington Manor (variously referred to as Elerintone, Serintone and Sirintone) and Tilton house (referred to as Telentone and Tilintone).

The Labour politician John C Wilmot (1895–1964) took his title of Baron from the village.

History
The local area has been a popular choice for inhabitation since Mesolithic times, with evidence of Mesolithic settlements discovered in old sandpits around the church in 1933. The results of the findings of this excavation can be viewed at the Barbican House Museum in Lewes. The museum also holds later evidence of a Saxon burial site, located behind Manor Cottages. This spot may have been so popular because of its plentiful natural springs, which were still used as the main water supply up until the 1950s when running water was installed.

The village maintains its country charm with its lack of streetlights or pavements, although in 2020 local outrage was caused when the petrol station at the edge of the village, flanking the A27, installed floodlights which are on throughout the night. Some villagers say this is a concern for the native South Downs wildlife species and are concerned correct planning procedures were not followed.

The village with its single street (aptly named 'The Street') marks a route between the Ouse and the Cuckmere rivers.

The church was originally Saxon, built in 1100, but after a fire in 1860 it was left as a ruin until 1867 when it was reconstructed with tile walls and a shingle spire.

In 1807 the cricket pitch was donated to the village and by 1834 the Selmeston cricket team was well-established, playing in the West Firle Poor Law Union.

The village school was constructed in 1846, made of Sussex flint with a tiled roof. It was closed in 1968 and is now a private residence and Grade II listed building.

The village hall was opened on the 27th July 1935, and is shared with Alciston.

Governance
The lowest tier of government for Selmeston is a Parish meeting. Instead of voting for representatives, a small parish may hold a community meeting twice a year to which all the electors may attend and vote on issues.

Wealden District Council is the next tier of government, for which Selmeston is part of the Alfriston ward, along with Alfriston, Berwick, Chalvington & Ripe and Alciston. The ward returns one councillor, who was a Conservative in the May 2007 election.

Selmeston is represented at the East Sussex County Council as part of the Alfriston, East Hoathly & Hellingly Ward. The May 2005 election returned the Conservative Councillor John Garvican.

The parliamentary district for Selmeston is Lewes. The general election in May 2015 elected the Conservative MP Maria Caulfield. She was re-elected in 2019.

Prior to Brexit in 2020, the village was part of the South East England constituency in the European Parliament.

References

External links

 https://selmeston.info/389-2/history-in-brief/ For a more detailed history of the village

Villages in East Sussex
Civil parishes in East Sussex
Wealden District